Section 3 is one of the eleven sections of the New York State Public High School Athletic Association (NYSPHSAA). The section covers Central New York and, like the other sections of the NYSPHSAA, is further divided into leagues. Each school is also given a class (i.e. AA, A, B...) based on the size of the school. Schools compete with their leagues mostly, but also compete with other schools throughout the season, especially towards the end of a season during championship time.

Leagues
Section 3 comprises seven leagues, some of which are even further broken down into smaller groups. The following is the list of leagues with their member schools in order of size, from largest to smallest, based on the number of schools in the league.

Onondaga High School League
The OHSL divides itself into three conferences based mostly on the size of the school. It is not exact however because of reclassifications. The Freedom Conference comprises Class A Schools, the Liberty Conference comprises Class B Schools, and the Patriot Conference comprises Class C and D Schools.

Freedom Conference
 Chittenango High School
 Cortland High School
 East Syracuse-Minoa High School
 George Fowler High School
 Fulton High School
 Jamesville-Dewitt High School
 Mexico High School
 Phoenix High School

Liberty Conference
 Cazenovia High School
 Christian Brothers Academy
 Hannibal High School
 Homer High School
 Jordan-Elbridge High School
 Marcellus High School
 Skaneateles High School
 Solvay High School
 Westhill High School

Patriot Conference
 Bishop Grimes High School
 Bishop Ludden High School
 Cato-Meridian High School
 Fabius-Pompey High School
 Faith Heritage School
 Lafayette High School
 Manlius Pebble Hill School
 Onondaga High School
 Port Byron High School
 Pulaski High School
 Syracuse Academy of Science
 Institute of Technology
 Tully High School
 Weedsport High School

Center State Conference
The Center State Conference is broken up into four divisions.

Division I
 Adirondack Central High School
 Canastota High School
 Central Valley High School
 Clinton High School
 Holland Patent Central High School
 Mount Markham High School
 Sherburne-Earlville High School

Division II
 Dolgeville Central High School
 Frankfort-Schuyler High School
 Herkimer High School
 Little Falls High School
 West Canada Valley Central High School

Division III
 Cooperstown Central High School
 Hamilton Central School
 Morrisville-Eaton High School
 Sauquoit Valley Central School
 Waterville Central School
 Westmoreland High School

Division IV
 New York Mills High School
 Oriskany High School
 Owen D Young High School
 Poland Central High School
 Remsen Central School
 Rome Catholic
 Town Of Webb School District

Frontier
Frontier is divided into four divisions.

A Division
 Carthage High School
 Immaculate Heart Central
 Indian River High School
 Watertown High School

B Division
 Altmar-Parish-Williamstown
 General Brown
 Lowville High School
 South Jefferson High School

C Division
 Beaver River High School
 Sandy Creek High School
 South Lewis High School
 Thousand Islands High School

D Division
 Alexandria High School
 Belleville-Henderson High School
 Copenhagen High School
 Lafargeville High School
 Lyme High School
 Sackets Harbor High School

CNYCL
The CNYCL is broken into five sections.

National
 Baldswinville High School
 Cicero-North Syracuse High School
 Henninger High School
 Liverpool High School
 West Genesee High School

American
 Auburn High School
 Central Square High School
 Corcoran High School
 Fayetteville-Manlius High School
 Nottingham High School
 Oswego High School

Tri-Valley
 New Hartford High School
 Notre Dame High School
 Oneida High School
 Rome Free Academy
 Utica Proctor
 Whitesboro High School

Central Counties
 Brookfield High School
 Cincinnatus High School
 DeRuyter High School
 Madison High School
 McGraw High School
 Otselic Valley High School
 Stockbridge Valley High School

Independents
 Blessed Virgin Mary High School
 Camden High School
 Living Word Academy
 Tyburn Academy
 Vernon-Verona-Sherrill High School

References

Organizations based in New York (state)
High school sports associations in the United States
Sports governing bodies in the United States
New York State Public High School Athletic Association sections